Vice Admiral David John Shackleton  (born 2 March 1948) is a retired senior officer of the Royal Australian Navy (RAN), who served as Chief of Navy from 1999 to 2002.

Early life
Shackleton was born in Leeds, United Kingdom, on 2 March 1948 to Ernest Shackleton and Elise Wilson. The family immigrated to Australia in 1959 and settled in Adelaide, where Shackleton was educated at Croydon High School.

Naval career
Shackleton joined the Navy in 1966 under Supplementary List (Executive) Scheme, and saw service in Vietnam while qualifying as a seaman officer. He was given command of the destroyer escort  in 1988, was the Maritime commander for the opposing forces during Exercise Kangaroo 1989, and reached the rank of captain in 1989. He commanded the destroyer  from 1991 to 1992, and was promoted to commodore in 1993.

He is a graduate of the RAN Staff College and the Joint Services Staff College, and has earned a Master of Business Administration (executive) from Monash University. He is a Fellow of the Australian Institute of Management and a Fellow of the Australian Institute of Company Directors.

He was promoted to rear admiral in 1998, and then vice admiral and Chief of Navy in 1999. He initiated various organisational changes across the Navy.

He was a senior Navy witness to the Senate Enquiry into the Children overboard affair. He was appointed Officer of the Order of Australia (AO) in 2000, and Commander of the United States Legion of Merit in 2001. He retired from the RAN in 2002.

Post-naval career 
Shackleton was appointed to the Defence SA Advisory Board in South Australia in 2007, the year of its establishment.

References

1948 births
Australian military personnel of the Vietnam War
Commanders of the Legion of Merit
Chiefs of Navy (Australia)
English emigrants to Australia
Fellows of the Australian Institute of Management
Living people
Monash University alumni
Officers of the Order of Australia
Military personnel from Leeds
Recipients of the Centenary Medal
Royal Australian Navy admirals
Fellows of the Australian Institute of Company Directors